El Parral is a municipality in the Mexican state of Chiapas, located approximately  south of the state capital of Tuxtla Gutiérrez.

Geography
The municipality of El Parral is located in the Chiapas Depression. It borders the municipalities of Chiapa de Corzo to the north, Venustiano Carranza to the east, Villa Corzo to the south, and Villaflores to the west.

The generally flat terrain of El Parral mostly consists of farmland and pastureland, although isolated patches of forest and jungle remain. The southeastern part of the municipality borders the Angostura Reservoir, the largest reservoir in Mexico in terms of total capacity, created by the Angostura Dam (officially called the Belisario Domínguez Dam) on the Grijalva River.

History
José Félix Flores Arellano is credited with founding the community of El Parral. He worked as a manager on a farm in the area in 1927 and was asked by locals to serve as President of the local Executive Agrarian Committee, which oversaw the construction of the area's first basic infrastructure such as roads, water supply, a telephone office and a school. El Parral was part of the municipality of Villa Corzo until 23 November 2011, when the decree raising El Parral to the level of an independent municipality was gazetted.

Administration
The following people have served as municipal president of El Parral:

Ramiro Antonio Ruíz González, 2012–2015
Henry Cordova Gómez, 2015–2018
Alber Molina Espinoza, 2018–2021

Demographics
In the 2010 Mexican Census, the localities that now comprise the municipality of El Parral recorded a total population of 14,171 inhabitants.

There are 157 localities in the municipality, of which only the municipal seat, also known as El Parral, is designated as urban. It recorded a population of 10,865 inhabitants in the 2010 Census.

Economy and infrastructure
Economic activities in El Parral include agriculture and fish farming.

The paved Chiapas Highway 157 runs north–south through the municipality, connecting El Parral with the municipalities of Chiapa de Corzo to the north and Villa Corzo to the south.

References

Municipalities of Chiapas
2011 establishments in Mexico
States and territories established in 2011